Devil Gets Her Way is the debut studio album by The Swearengens, released in 2012. It was named one of "Seattle's Best Country Albums of 2012" by Seattle Weekly.

Track listing
All songs written by Fredd Luongo.

Production
Steven Burnett, Fredd Luongo, Corey Knafelz – recording
Scott Colburn (Gravelvoice) – drum & bass tracking
Johnny Sangster (Avast) – mixing
Ed Brooks (RFI) – mastering
Liz Moody – cover art
Christi Williford – cover design

See also
2012 in music

References

External links
 Album lyrics and audio samples

2012 debut albums